S7N (pronounced "seven") is a Mexican heavy metal band from Mexico City, Mexico, founded in 2012 by guitarist and vocalist Mao Kanto and guitarist Guillermo García.

History

Formation, demos and Fearless (2009–2013)
S7N was formed in 2009 in Mexico City by guitarists Mao Kanto and Guillermo García. The name was adopted after Kanto's personal experience on July 7, 2007 (07-07-07). A few months later, guitarist Israel Monroy, bassist Lalo Olvera, and drummer Zared joined the band. During the early years, S7N performed as a cover band while writing their first original songs. Zared departed the band in 2012, leading to the inclusion of Fabián Carreño on drums and the beginning of the recordings for their debut album, Fearless. The album was released on November 25, 2013, with official videos released for "Blackout" and "Double Dealing".

Deadline and national success (2014–present)
The release of Fearless brought the attention of Mexican media, leading to S7N's participation as opening act for several artists during 2014, such as Havok, Ghost, and Napalm Death. The album received a nomination for Best Metal Album at the Mexico Independent Music Awards.

In 2015, "Blackout" was used as part of Netflix's Club de Cuervos soundtrack, on Season 1's Episode 7, as well as on EMP UNDERGROUND Volume One, a compilation for EMP Label Group. On March 14, the band played for the first time Vive Latino, the most important Latin rock festival in Mexico, on the Carpa Intolerante stage. On May 9, they played Force Fest in Guadalajara on the Main Stage, sharing the lineup with Overkill and Judas Priest. On September 12, S7N shared the stage with former Mötley Crüe singer John Corabi and Mexican bands such as Maligno and Agora at Hair Fest.

During 2016, the band received further recognition, and they played their first concert outside Mexico at Rock Fiesta in Quartzsite, Arizona alongside some of the most iconic Mexican rock bands, such as El Tri, Caifanes, Café Tacuba, Maldita Vecindad, and Molotov. This show marked their first appearance after Carreño's departure earlier that year, with Agora's Eduardo Carrillo filling in for a couple of shows. Carrillo was also part of the recording of the band's sophomore album Deadline as co-producer along with fellow Agora's Manuel Vázquez at their own SoundMob Studio, with Los Viejos's Leo Padua performing drums. Deadline was released on June 17, after a successful crowdfunding campaign. Later that year, the band recruited drummer Adrián Mayorga and played main stage on October 15 at Slipknot's Knotfest, on the festival's second edition at Mexico. To end the year, they closed the Agaves Stage at Coordenada festival in Guadalajara.

On April 29, 2016, S7N released "Innocent Guilty" as the first single from Deadline through a lyric video. On May 5, 2017, "Bomb Maker" was released as the second single, with a music video directed by Lack of Remorse's singer Andrei Pulver. S7N repeated their appearance at Knotfest Mexico 2017 after Asesino cancelled their participation.

Members

Current members
Mao Kanto - lead vocals, rhythm guitar (2009–present)
Israel Monroy - lead guitar, backing vocals (2009–present)
Lalo Olvera - bass (2009–present)
Stu Zepeda - drums (2018–present)

Former members
Zared – drums (2009–2012)
Fabián Carreño - drums (2012–2016)
Adrián Mayorga - drums (2016–2018)
Guillermo García - guitar (2009-2022)

Touring members
Eduardo Carrillo – drums (2016)

Timeline

Discography

Studio albums

Singles

Music videos

References

External links
Official Page
Facebook Page
Encyclopaedia Metallum
El Melómano's S7N interview (Spanish)

Mexican heavy metal musical groups
Mexican thrash metal musical groups
Musical groups established in 2009
2009 establishments in Mexico
English-language singers from Mexico